Cahermore ringfort or sometimes Caher Mór or "Ballyallaban stone fort" is a ringfort south of Ballyvaughan in the Burren area, in County Clare, Ireland. It is a National Monument.

Location
The fort lies right next to the R480 road between the village of Ballyvaughan and Leamaneh Castle. It is located in the townland of Ballyallaban in the civil parish of Rathborney.

Description
The walls are up to 9 feet thick and 9 feet high, with two faces of large, well-fitted blocks with rubble filled in between. The lintel and building remains inside the fort are considered late medieval features. Next to the entryway are guard chambers, which could indicate that the former inhabitants were of high status.

The national monument number 648 actually consists of two separate forts: the stone fort of Cahermore and the nearby earthen Ballyallaban ringfort.

Excavation
A limited excavation occurred after the lintel stone fell down in the late 1990s. A coin from 1690 was found.

According to the National Monuments Service: "Excavation (Licence no. 99E0506) in this area took place in June 1999 as the entranceway was blocked with rubble and the lintel had fallen across the entrance passage. The excavations revealed that the structures around the entrance were a 14th/15th-century addition to the pre-existing fort. A scallop shell from below the foundations was radiocarbon dated to AD 1308. The lintel was replaced and the entranceway was consolidated in 2001."

References

Further reading
 Fitzpatrick, M., 2000, Cathair Mór, Ballyallaban. In: I. Bennett (ed.), Excavations 1999: summary accounts of archaeological excavations in Ireland, 12, No. 38. Bray. Wordwell.
 Fitzpatrick, M., 2001, Cahermore stone fort, Co. Clare: Survey and Excavation. North Munster Antiquarian Journal 41, pp. 45-64.
 Westropp, T.J, 1901, Prehistoric remains in north-western Clare part II. Journal of the Royal Society of Antiquaries of Ireland 31, pp. 273-91.

External links
 Information at Clare Library
 T.J. Westropp on the forts of Ballyallaban

Archaeological sites in County Clare
Forts in the Republic of Ireland
Former populated places in Ireland
National Monuments in County Clare